Meirionnydd Nant Conwy was a constituency of the National Assembly for Wales between 1999 and 2007. It elected one Assembly Member by the first past the post method of election. Also, however, it was one of eight constituencies in the Mid and West Wales electoral region, which elected four additional members, in addition to eight constituency members, to produce a degree of proportional representation for the region as a whole.

Boundaries
The constituency was created for the first election to the Assembly, in 1999, with the name and boundaries of the Meirionnydd Nant Conwy Westminster constituency. It was partly within the preserved county of Clwyd and partly within the preserved county of Gwynedd. The constituency was abolished following boundary changes for the 2007 Assembly elections.

The other seven constituencies of the region were Brecon and Radnorshire, Carmarthen East and Dinefwr, Carmarthen West and South Pembrokeshire, Ceredigion, Llanelli, Montgomeryshire and Preseli Pembrokeshire.

Voting
In elections for the National Assembly for Wales, each voter has two votes. The first vote may be used to vote for a candidate to become the Assembly Member for the voter's constituency, elected by the first past the post system. The second vote may be used to vote for a regional closed party list of candidates. Additional member seats are allocated from the lists by the d'Hondt method, with constituency results being taken into account in the allocation.

Assembly members

Elections

2003

1999

References

Former Senedd constituencies in the Mid and West Wales electoral region
1999 establishments in Wales
Constituencies established in 1999
2007 disestablishments in Wales
Constituencies disestablished in 2007